The Men's individual pursuit (CP 3) at the 2008 Summer Paralympics took place on 7 August at the Laoshan Velodrome. The pre-event favorite to win the gold medal was reigning champion, Darren Kenny of Great Britain.

Preliminaries 
Favourite, Kenny, managed to set a new world record in the preliminary round. The new record was 5.812 seconds faster than the previous record, which was set by Kenny in Alkmar in 2005. Javier Ochoa was disqualified for riding too close to his opponent in the preliminary round, after he had been overtaken by Kenny. Kenny stated that he was disappointed by this as he would have liked to compete against Ochoa in the final.

Q = Qualifier
PR = Paralympic Record
WR = World Record

Finals 
Kenny went on to catch his opponent, Yong-Sik Jin of South Korea, in the final round.

Gold medal match

Bronze medal match

References 

Men's individual pursuit (CP 3)